John Stuart, Lord Mount Stuart (25 September 1767 – 22 January 1794), was a British Tory politician.

Mount Stuart was the son of the John Stuart, 1st Marquess of Bute, and the grandson of Prime Minister John Stuart, 3rd Earl of Bute. His mother was the Hon. Charlotte Jane, daughter and heiress of Herbert Windsor, 2nd Viscount Windsor. He was born at Grosvenor Square, London, in 1767 and educated at Eton and St John's College, Cambridge.

In 1790, he was elected Member of Parliament for Cardiff, a seat he held until his death. He took over from his father as Colonel of the Glamorgan Militia in 1791 and was also Lord-Lieutenant of Glamorganshire between 1793 and his death.

Lord Mount Stuart married Lady Elizabeth McDouall-Crichton, daughter of Patrick McDouall-Crichton, 6th Earl of Dumfries, and his wife Margaret (née Crauford), on 12 October 1792. They had two sons, who both added the surname "Crichton" before that of "Stuart" in 1805:

John Crichton-Stuart, 2nd Marquess of Bute (10 August 1793 – 18 March 1848)
Lord Patrick James Herbert Crichton-Stuart (25 August 1794 – 7 September 1859). In 1817 he obtained the rank of the son of a Marquess, which his father would have been, had he not died before his father, the 1st Marquess.

Lord Mount Stuart died at Bassingbourn Hall near Stansted, Essex, in January 1794, only 26 years of age, a month after being injured in a fall from his horse. Lady Mount Stuart survived him by three years and died in July 1797, aged 24.

References 

1767 births
1794 deaths
Alumni of St John's College, Cambridge
British courtesy barons and lords of Parliament
British MPs 1790–1796
Heirs apparent who never acceded
Lord-Lieutenants of Glamorgan
Glamorgan Militia officers
Members of the Parliament of Great Britain for Welsh constituencies
People educated at Eton College
Tory MPs (pre-1834)
John